Englemann Canyon (also spelled Engleman's Canon) is a valley along Ruxton Creek, in Manitou Springs, El Paso County, Colorado. It is one of three canyons in Manitou Springs, the others are Ute Pass and Williams Canyon.

Upper Englemann Canyon
In 1880, a trail was opened in Englemann Canyon to Pikes Peak. It was called the Manitou Trail in 1883. Zalmon Simmons surveyed the canyon for telegraph lines. The Civil War veteran and later inventor of the Simmons mattress decided that the canyon was suited for construction of a cog railway. The Manitou and Pike's Peak Railway, built by Simmons and completed in 1890, begins in Englemann Canyon and follows Ruxton Creek up into the Rocky Mountains for Pikes Peak. The railroad climbs at an average 16% grade through the canyon past "stately spruces and jagged rocks". The first third of the  railway trip is through Englemann Canyon, alongside Ruxton Creek. Scenery includes large boulders, Ponderosa pine trees, Engelmann spruce, and Colorado blue spruce. Sights in the canyon include Artist's Glen, Minnehaha Falls, Son-of-a-Gun Hill, Hells Gate, the site of Halfway House, and Ruxton Park. The Halfway House was the 22-room bed and breakfast along Ruxton Creek.  Some of its guests were delivered by burros via a Pikes Peak burro trail. The accommodations became less desirable when the cog railway was built about 30 feet from the house. The Halfway House was a rustic hotel that served tourists who took the railway. Minnehaha, named for its falls, was a hamlet with several cabins. 

In 1891, the canyon was described in The Illustrated American as "a narrow valley, with a steep mountain rising on either side, and the clear, sparkling Ruxton Creek rushing parallel to the track, sometimes dashing over rocks hundreds of feet below the train, and sometimes pausing for a moment to form a deep, smooth pool, such as the speckled trout loves to haunt."

In 1925, a water utility power plant was built in Ruxton Park for $16,866  by the city of Colorado Springs. The stone hydroelectric plant generates electricity as Ruxton Creek flows into Manitou Springs from the mountain.

Lower Englemann Canyon
In the early 20th century, an electric trolley of the Colorado Springs and Interurban Railway from Colorado Springs terminated at Manitou Springs, and a trolley, called the "Dinky" carried passengers up lower Englemann Canyon (Ruxton Road) to the Manitou and Pike's Peak Railway depot. 

In 1891 the canyon had one spring, the Ute-Iron spring, Near the depot there were three mineral springs in 1913: Ute-Iron, Little Chief, and Ouray springs. near the Iron Springs Hotel. The current Manitou Mineral Springs on Ruxton Avenue are Iron Spring and Twin Spring.

Notes

References

External links
 Englemann Canyon, topographic map

Canyons and gorges of Colorado
Landforms of El Paso County, Colorado
Manitou Springs, Colorado